The Time and Temperature Building, originally known as the Chapman Building, and officially 477 Congress Street, is a fourteen-story office building in downtown Portland, Maine. The building is named after a large three-sided four-element eggcrate display screen on the roof that flashes the local time and temperature. It was built in 1924 as a twelve-story building, with Maine's first indoor shopping center on its ground floor. It is located next door to the ten story Fidelity Trust Building; until the 1970s, these buildings were Portland's only skyscrapers.

The building, being one of Portland's tallest, is visible on the horizon for a number of miles, including from Peaks Island across the harbor, and it has become a landmark to Portlanders depending on it for not only the sign's time and temperature, but to find their way into Portland.

Time and temperature sign
The time and temperature sign was added to the building in 1964.

Maine law prohibits flashing messages on signs visible from state highways, but in 1991, the Maine Legislature passed a grandfather clause exemption to allow the Time and Temperature building to utilize advertising to cover operating costs. A new sign was installed in 1999, which as well as the time and temperature, broadcasts messages consisting of two lines, each with four characters. Advertising messages have included "WMTW NEWS", from television station WMTW-TV, whose studios were located in the building from 1999 until 2015, and "CALL JOE", from advertising lawyer Joe Bornstein. When a snowstorm is severe enough to result in a snow emergency, the sign flashes the words "PARK BAN", to remind people not to park on the street.

In 2010, when a malfunction resulted in the sign going dark, around sixty concerned people contacted the building's owners to let them know.

History

The Chapman Building was designed by local architect Herbert W. Rhodes, who also designed nearby hotel The Eastland. In 1964, Casco Bank, the owner of the building, added two stories, and installed a flashing time and temperature sign on the roof. The addition was incongruent with the original style of the building, but a major renovation in the 1980s in more naturally integrated it into the lower floors.  

In 1995, millionaire philanthropist Elizabeth Noyce's  Libra Foundation purchased the building. Renovations were completed in 1996, and a new time and temperature sign was installed on the roof in 1999. In 2003, the Libra Foundation sold the building to 477 Congress LLC, a subsidiary of Kalmon Dolgin Affiliates. By 2016, occupancy had dropped to 60%, as lack of maintenance had caused tenants to vacate the building. The building was taken into foreclosure by Wells Fargo on May 11, 2016. Building ownership passed to CW Capital Asset Management, a loan servicing company. An inspection in November 2017 by the Portland Fire Department found 19 fire-safety violations. The building was sold at auction for $9.3 million in October 2018 to TT Maine Venture.

References

Office buildings completed in 1924
Office buildings in Portland, Maine
Skyscraper office buildings in Maine
1924 establishments in Maine